New Canaan station is a commuter rail station on the New Canaan Branch of the Metro-North Railroad's New Haven Line in New Canaan, Connecticut.

History

The town of New Canaan bought an option for a site on Old Stamford Road in March 1955, which would allow the town to build a new station with a parking lot, and the New York, New Haven and Hartford Railroad announced plans for the new station and parking lot that September. The railroad and the town agreed on final plans in June 1959, and officials had announced their plan to build the station at Fairty Orchards by that September. Residents narrowly voted against the planned station that November, and they voted down the plan again in 1961 by a much wider margin.

On July 13, 1976, two trains collided at the New Canaan station, killing two and injuring 29. In October 1976, the CDOT released their report, which only blamed the engineer of the northbound train for excessive speed. The National Transportation Safety Board also recommended that an automatic safety system be installed near the New Canaan station.

The station platform was closed for several months in 1982 because it was crumbling; during that time, only the last two or three cars opened their doors at the station.

In 1998, the state began a 10-year lease (ending June 30, 2008) to the town  at both the Talmadge Hill and New Canaan stations, allowing the town to perform some maintenance, repairs and cleaning while the state retains responsibility and control over major structural renovations and repairs. Money collected for parking goes into a special fund to be used for station-related purposes with the state's approval, and the state also must approve parking-fee regulations. The town has the option of renewing the lease for another 10-year term.

On July 7, 2010, the ticket office at the station was closed, with vending machines on the platforms still available.

Station layout
The station has one five-car-long high-level side platform to the west of the tracks. The station is served by 3 tracks from the New Canaan Branch. Two tracks east of the platform track are used for train storage.

The station has commuter parking in several parking lots within a short walk from the station. There are two lots near the station with numbered spaces for daily parking.

References

External links

 Station House from Google Maps Street View
 Station from Park Avenue from Google Maps Street View

Metro-North Railroad stations in Connecticut
Stations along New York, New Haven and Hartford Railroad lines
Railroad stations in Fairfield County, Connecticut
Buildings and structures in New Canaan, Connecticut
Railway stations in the United States opened in 1868
1868 establishments in Connecticut